In historic Chilean agriculture an inquilino is a labourer indebted to a landlord who allows him to form a farm in parts of his property (usually in the marginal lands to keep away intruders) and who in exchange works without pay for the landlord. The inquilinos provided key manpower to carry out tasks like the gathering of livestock (rodeo) and slaughter. For inquilinos living in wheat-producing regions duties increased as the Chilean wheat cycle went on in from the 18th century onwards. 
The inquilinaje institution that characterized large parts of Chilean agriculture were eliminated by the Chilean land reform in the 1960s and early 1970s. Historian Mario Góngora has researched on the history of the inquilinos. 

In modern Spanish the word has the same meaning as the English "tenant".

See also
Crofting
Tenant farmer

References

Debt bondage
History of agriculture in Chile
History of labour relations in Chile
Labor rights